Arctia elisabethae is a moth of the family Erebidae. It was described by Hans Kotzsch in 1939. It is found in the Hindu Kush mountain range.

The species of the genus Oroncus, including this one, were moved to Arctia as a result of phylogenetic research published by Rönkä et al. in 2016.

References

Spilosomina
Moths described in 1939
Moths of Asia